Mark Einar Johnson (born September 22, 1957) is an American ice hockey coach for the University of Wisconsin–Madison women's ice hockey team. He is a former National Hockey League (NHL) player who appeared in 669 NHL regular season games between 1980 and 1990. He also played for the gold medal-winning 1980 U.S. Olympic team.

Amateur career
As a teenager, Johnson attended James Madison Memorial High School, where he was on the hockey team.  He then played for the University of Wisconsin–Madison ice hockey team for three years under his father, legendary coach Bob Johnson. In 1977, during his first year at the university, he helped the Badgers win the NCAA national championship.  He was the first Badger to win the WCHA Rookie of the year. He went on to become the school's leading goal scorer and second all-time scorer. Johnson was also a two time All-American. His younger brother, Peter, also played at the university.

International and professional career
Johnson made his international debut with the United States national team as an 18-year-old in 1976, when he played in 11 training games for the 1976 U.S. Olympic ice hockey team coached by his father. He represented the United States in 13 international tournaments (including the 1978, 1979, 1981, 1982, 1985, 1986, 1987, 1990 Ice Hockey World Championship tournaments and the 1981, 1984 and 1987 Canada Cup). He was a star player on the "Miracle on Ice" U.S. Olympic Hockey team at the 1980 Lake Placid winter games.

Playing for the United States against the Soviet Union, Johnson scored two of the four goals in the Team USA 4–3 victory. His first goal, scored with one second left in the game's first period, led to the Soviet coach taking out his goalie, Vladislav Tretiak, who was considered the best goalie in the world at the time; years later, when Johnson asked Soviet defenseman Slava Fetisov, now an NHL teammate, about the decision, he was simply told, "Coach crazy". He also scored in the third period to tie the game at 3–3. The team then defeated Finland to capture the gold medal, with Johnson assisting on the game-winning goal and scoring the insurance goal with less than four minutes remaining in the game. Johnson was named team MVP.

Johnson went on to play professional hockey in the NHL for the Pittsburgh Penguins, Minnesota North Stars, Hartford Whalers, St. Louis Blues, and New Jersey Devils. He played in the 1984 NHL All Star game as the Whalers representative and served as the Whalers' captain in 1983–85. He also played two seasons with Milan Saima SG in Italy and a final season in Austria before retiring in 1992. He briefly came out of retirement to play two games for Team USA in the 1998 Men's World Ice Hockey Championships qualifying tournament at the age of 41, where he helped Team USA retain its position in the World Championships' Pool A.

In 2010, thirty years after winning the Olympic gold medal as a player, Johnson coached the United States women's national ice hockey team, which won a silver medal in the Vancouver games.

On February 9, 2019, the University of Wisconsin retired #10 during a pre-game presentation at the Kohl Center. Johnson was the first player to have his number retired.

Coaching career
Johnson is the head coach of the University of Wisconsin–Madison women's ice hockey team, a position he has held since 2002. The team won its first NCAA national championship on March 26, 2006.  They repeated as national champions in 2007, 2009, 2011, 2019, 2021, and 2023. Prior to coaching the women's team, Johnson was an assistant coach for the Wisconsin Badgers men's ice hockey team from 1996 until 2002.

Johnson has won the following awards and championships as head coach:
 7× National Champion (2005–06, 2006–07, 2008–09, 2010–11, 2018–19, 2020–21, 2022-23)
 8× WCHA Regular Season Champion (2005–06, 2006–07, 2010–11, 2011–12, 2015–16, 2016–17, 2017–18, 2019–20)
 8× WCHA Tournament Champion (2005–06, 2006–07, 2008–09, 2010–11, 2014–15, 2015–16, 2016–17, 2018-19)
 4× AHCA Coach of the Year (2006, 2007, 2009, 2011)
He served as an assistant coach for the American national men's hockey team in 2000 and 2002. On July 6, 2006, he was named head coach of the American women's team as part of a general reorganization of the program, leading the women's hockey team to a silver medal at the 2010 Olympics.

Johnson coached the Madison Monsters minor league hockey team during their inaugural 1995–96 season.

*Johnson spent the 2009–10 season coaching the US Olympic Women's Ice Hockey Team, finishing with a silver medal at XXI Winter Games.

NCAA National Title Game Appearances
 2006 - Wisconsin 3 vs. Minnesota 0
 2007 - Wisconsin 4 vs. Minnesota-Duluth 1
 2008 - Wisconsin 0 vs. Minnesota-Duluth 4
 2009 - Wisconsin 5 vs. Mercyhurst 0
 2011 - Wisconsin 4 vs. Boston University 1
 2012 - Wisconsin 2 vs. Minnesota 4
 2017 - Wisconsin 0 vs. Clarkson 3
2019 - Wisconsin 2 vs. Minnesota 0
2021 - Wisconsin 2 vs. Northeastern 1 OT
2023 - Wisconsin 1 vs. Ohio State 0

In popular culture
Michael Cummings played Johnson in the 1981 TV movie Miracle on Ice.

Johnson's son, Patrick Johnson, played for the men's hockey team at the University of Wisconsin–Madison. He coaches his daughter, Mikayla, who plays for the women's hockey team at the University of Wisconsin-Madison. His other son, Chris Johnson, played for the men's hockey team at Augsburg College, and now serves as an assistant coach on the Augsburg men's hockey team. His other daughter, Megan, also plays hockey for the women's team at Augsburg College.

Eric Peter-Kaiser portrayed him in the 2004 Disney film Miracle.  Peter-Kaiser was playing college hockey for SUNY Potsdam when he got the part.

Awards and achievements
 2011 Lester Patrick Trophy for outstanding service to hockey in the United States.
 Johnson was inducted into the Wisconsin Hockey Hall of Fame in 2001 and the United States Hockey Hall of Fame in 2004.
 He completed his B.A. degree in kinesiology at the University of Wisconsin in 1994.

 Played in NHL All-Star Game (1984)
 WCHA Freshman of the Year (1977)
 WCHA Most Valuable Player (1979)
United States National Team Coach
 2000 Men’s World Championship (Assistant)
 2002 Men’s World Championship (Assistant)
 2006 Women’s Four Nations Cup (Head)
 2007 Women’s World Championship (Head)
 2007 Women’s Under-22 Select Team (Head)
 2008 Women’s Under-18 Select Team (Head)
 2010 Women's Olympic Team (Head)

He was elected to the Wisconsin Athletic Hall of Fame in 2003.

Career statistics

Regular season and playoffs

International

See also
 Notable families in the NHL

References

External links
 
 Mark Johnson's hockeydraftcentral.com profile
 Profile at Wisconsin Hockey Hall of Fame

1957 births
1980 US Olympic ice hockey team
AHCA Division I men's ice hockey All-Americans
American expatriate ice hockey players in Austria
American expatriate ice hockey players in Italy
American men's ice hockey centers
Birmingham Bulls draft picks
Hartford Whalers captains
Hartford Whalers players
Ice hockey people from Minneapolis
Ice hockey players at the 1980 Winter Olympics
IIHF Hall of Fame inductees
Lester Patrick Trophy recipients
Living people
Medalists at the 1980 Winter Olympics
Medalists at the 2010 Winter Olympics
HC Milano players
Minnesota North Stars players
National Hockey League All-Stars
NCAA men's ice hockey national champions
New Jersey Devils players
Olympic gold medalists for the United States in ice hockey
Olympic silver medalists for the United States in ice hockey
Pittsburgh Penguins draft picks
Pittsburgh Penguins players
Sports coaches from Minneapolis
St. Louis Blues players
United States Hockey Hall of Fame inductees
Wisconsin Badgers men's ice hockey players
Wisconsin Badgers women's ice hockey coaches
EK Zell am See players